The , also known as the Nagasaki―Qing Navy Incident (長崎清国水兵事件), was an August 1886 riot involving Chinese Beiyang Fleet sailors in Nagasaki.

Outline
On 1 August 1886 (Meiji 19), the Qing dynasty's Beiyang Fleet, consisting of four warships, the Dingyuan, the Zhenyuan, the Jiyuan, and Weiyuan, entered the Nagasaki harbor port during a visit to various major Asian harbours. At that time, Qing China was militarily superior to Meiji Japan. The Dingyuan had more tonnage than the heaviest Japanese cruisers in service, due to Japan's policy of following the Jeune École naval strategy, which emphasized small rapid assault craft. In addition, Japan had recently suffered setbacks in the Gapsin Coup in which around 400 Japanese troops stationed in Joseon Korea were defeated by nearly 2,000 Qing-Joseon soldiers.

On August 13, around 500 Chinese troops took shore leave. Many went to the red-light district leading an altercations with locals with the resulting property damages blamed on the soldiers. Locals also claimed that drunken Chinese soldiers went around the city pursuing women and children much to public outrage. The Nagasaki Prefecture Police Department attempted to restore order with the help of a large number of local civilians. The policemen engaged in several hand-to-hand battles with the Chinese sailors who used swords purchased from stores; the melees resulted in at least 80 deaths. A sense of unrest subsequently pervaded across the city.

On August 14, at a conference between the governor of Nagasaki prefecture Kusaka Yoshio and the Qing consulate Xuan Cai, the Qing navy prohibited its soldiers from coming ashore as a group for one day and agreed to have their troops supervised by officers when on leave.

On August 15, at around 1:00 PM, following the cessation of the agreement, about 300 Qing troops went ashore; some were armed with clubs. A group of Qing sailors attacked three police officers, resulting in one death. A driver of a rickshaw (jinrikisha) witnessed the scuffle and, in indignation, tried to punch one of the Qing troops. In response, the Qing sailors rioted. The Nagasaki police responded and again fought with the Qing sailors, resulting in more casualties. On the Qing side, 4 were killed (1 officer and 3 soldiers) and 53 were injured (3 officers and 50 soldiers). On the Japanese side, 2 constables were killed with 3 police officers injured along with 16 more. Several tens of Japanese civilians were also injured.

Effects of the incident
Combined with the Gapsin Coup of 1884 (Meiji 17), the incident stirred up anti-Qing sentiment and was regarded as a distant cause to the First Sino-Japanese War. Also, Toyoma Mitsuru created the political association called the Genyosha, which was the first turning away from civil rights theory to sovereign rights theory.

The Qing did not apologize to Japan for the incident and behaved with confidence in the superiority of their navy. At that time, the Qing possessed the newest model of navy battleships: the Dingyuan. It was thought that the Japanese navy could not match this ship at this time as the German-built Dingyuan possessed more tonnage than the French-built Japanese cruisers that were in service. (The Dingyuan was eventually scuttled after the Battle of Weihaiwei in 1895.) The Qing's confidence was bolstered by the events of the Gapsin Coup where a small Japanese contingent was defeated by a much larger Qing-Joseon garrison.

The Qing successfully made demands to the Japanese government wherein Japanese police would not prohibit the wielding of swords by visiting Qing troops; the Japanese were also forced to pay a large sum for reparations. These concessions however stoked anti-Qing sentiment in Japan, presaging further confrontation.

The incident is notable for a significant consequence: the cracking of the Qing intelligence code. A Japanese man named Wu Oogoro picked up a Beiyang Navy sailor's dictionary which was marked with 0-9 between the Chinese characters (Kanji). The Japanese intelligence department subsequently analysed these characters and figures and determined that it was a guide to decipher Qing codes. In order to completely crack the code, Japanese Foreign Minister Mutsu Munemitsu deliberately provided a writing in Chinese characters of moderate length to the Qing ambassador Wang Feng Cao. The next day the Japan Telecom legation successfully intercepted the telegram sent by the embassy to Zongli Yamen. Sato Yoshimaro, a bureaucrat in the telecom legation, used this kanji text with known content to crack the Qing code. This provided Japan with an advantage in the First Sino-Japanese war.

See also 
 First Sino-Japanese War

References

1886 in China
1886 in Japan
1886 in international relations
1886 riots
August 1886 events
Riots and civil disorder in Japan
China–Japan relations
History of Nagasaki
Beiyang Fleet
Military history of the Qing dynasty